The following list presents Eastern Orthodox churches in Toronto, Ontario, Canada. As of January 2010, there are 28 Orthodox churches within Toronto, 9 Mission stations, 4 Chapels, and 1 monastery, for a total of 42 canonical Orthodox sanctuaries.

The first Orthodox community established in the city of Toronto was the Greek Orthodox Community of St. George, founded in 1909, presently located on Bond Street in the heart of downtown Toronto. This was followed by Sts. Cyril and Methody Macedono-Bulgarian Church, founded one year later in 1910, presently located on Dundas and Sackville Streets, and the Russian Orthodox Church of Christ the Saviour in 1915, of the Orthodox Church in America (OCA).

Canonical Orthodox Churches

Ecumenical Patriarchate

Greek Orthodox Metropolis of Toronto (Canada)

Ukrainian Orthodox Church of Canada (UOCC)

(Diocese: Toronto and the Eastern Eparchy)

American Carpatho-Russian Orthodox Diocese (ACROD)

{| class="wikitable"
|- bgcolor="lightblue"
!width=28%|Congregation
!width=18%|Location
!width=20%|Dates
!width=35%|Notes
!width=7%|Image
|-
| St. Euphrosynia of Polotsk Belarusian-Greek Orthodox Church
| Dovercourt-Wallace Emerson-Junction
| 1950,1953,1957
|

 1950 The first Liturgy and prayers were held at the first location, on 23 March. Fr. Mikhail Mihai celebrated the Liturgy, a Greek Orthodox priest of Belarusian origin.
 1952 In October the parish was officially recognized by the Ecumenical Patriarch's Exarch for North America.
 1953 The parish, supported by the Belarusian National Association in Canada (BNA), bought a five-room house at 11 Cunningham Avenue. On 28 June the first Liturgy was celebrated there.
 1957 First Liturgy in the new church at 1008 Dovercourt Rd (bought in 1956) is celebrated on 4 August 1957, under Very Rev. V. Sahaidakivskyi.
 1966 Church was renovated and a church hall was built. Fr. V. Sahaidakivskyi supervised the acquisition of nearly twenty icons from the Iablochynski Belarusian Greek Orthodox Monastery in the western Belastok Region.
 1970 Parish celebrated 20th anniversary on 31 May, with Greek Orthodox Bishop Theodosius celebrating with Archimandrite I. Strok, the parish priest and four other Greek Orthodox priests. 
 1975 Parish celebrated 25th anniversary on 12 October, with Greek Orthodox Bishop Sotirios in attendance with the Very Rev. P. Veliki, parish priest.
 2008 Church is transferred from Greek-Orthodox Diocese of Toronto to the American Carpatho-Russian Orthodox Diocese.
|
|-
| St. John the Compassionate Mission
| Riverdale, Toronto
| 1986 
|
 <small>Mission</small>
 In 1986, St. John the Compassionate Mission was erected as mission-parish of the Ukrainian Catholic church by Bishop Isidore Borecky, to serve any one in the city in need of spiritual or material help.
 In 2001, under Bishop Cornelius Pasichny, it was released and received by Metropolitan Nicholas (Smisko) as an Apostolate of the Carpatho-Russian Diocese of the Ecumenical Patriarchate.
 It serves all ages and all people in need regardless of background. Youth Summer camps are operated by the mission in co-operation with St Mary of Egypt Refuge. All liturgical services at the mission are offered in English. Its doors are open six day a week.
|
|-
| St. Silouan The Athonite Orthodox Church
| Regent Park / Riverdale, Toronto
| 2002
| 
 English / Multicultural Parish with over 9 languages spoken 
Operates liturgical worship, hospitality program to those in need in the local community, educational programs, child education (Montessori based Cateishm of the Good Shephard), youth and family programs.
Colocated and partnered with St. John the Compassionate Mission until 2018. 
Since 2018, it is located on the lower level of St. Cyril & Methody Macedono-Bulgarian Eastern Orthodox Cathedral.
|
|-
| St. Zoticos Orthodox Mission
| Scarborough Village
| 2018
| 
English / Multicultural Mission
Along with Scarborough Good Neighbours Drop In, it seeks to live out in the everyday the beauty of the gospel. We are centered on the liturgy as the presence of Christ among the people of Scarborough. All services are mostly in English.
Ministry of St John the Compassionate Mission in Toronto
|
|}

Bulgarian Eastern Orthodox Diocese of the USA, Canada, and Australia

Macedonian Orthodox Church - Ohrid Archbishopric

Orthodox Church in America (OCA)

OCA - Archdiocese of Canada

OCA - Romanian Episcopate

Russian Orthodox Church Outside Russia (ROCOR)
 
(Diocese: The Montreal and Canada Diocese)

Patriarchal Representation of the Russian Orthodox Church in Toronto

Serbian Orthodox Diocese of Canada
 
(Diocese: Serbian Orthodox Eparchy of Canada)

Romanian Orthodox Archdiocese in the Americas

Georgian Orthodox Diocese of America and Canada

Antiochian Orthodox Christian Archdiocese of North America

Not members of the Canadian Conference of Orthodox Bishops 

Old Calendar Jurisdictions or Traditional Orthodox Churches

Bishop Akakios (Ntouskos) of Montreal

Metropolis of the Genuine Greek Orthodox Church (GOC) of America

(Florinite, 1937-)
(Holy Metropolis of Toronto, under Metropolitan Moses)
 (A Metropolis of the Genuine Orthodox Church of Greece, under Archbishop Kallinikos of Athens and All Greece (2010-present))

True Orthodox Church of Greece ("Makarian (Lamian) Synod")

(Florinite, 1995-)
(True Orthodox Church of Greece under Archbishop Makarios of Athens and All Greece (2004-present))

Matthewite True Orthodox Christians in the United States

(Matthewite)
(Genuine Orthodox Church of Greece, under Archbishop Nicholas of Athens and All Greece)

Unrecognized Independent Churches

Belarusian Autocephalous Orthodox Church

Free Serbian Orthodox Church

See alsoToronto Church Lists List of Anglican churches in Toronto
 List of Presbyterian churches in Toronto
 List of Roman Catholic churches in Toronto
 List of United Church of Canada churches in Toronto
 List of Synagogues in TorontoOther Church Lists List of Coptic Orthodox Churches in Canada (Non-Chalcedonian)
 List of Greek Orthodox churches in the United StatesGeneral'''
 Byzantine Rite Christianity in Canada
 Timeline of Eastern Orthodoxy in America
 List of cemeteries in Toronto

Notes

References

Churches, Orthodox
Orthodox
Religious buildings and structures in Toronto
Toronto
Toronto, Orthodox churches
Christianity in Ontario
Eastern Orthodoxy-related lists